Bhoothath Alvar is one of the twelve Alvar saints of South India, who were known for their affiliation to the Vaishnava tradition of Hinduism. The verses of Alvars are compiled as Nalayira Divya Prabandham and the 108 temples revered are classified as Divya Desams. Bhoothath is considered second in the list of the three principal Alvars, with the other two being Poigai Alvar and Pey Alvar, collectively called Mutalamalvargal who are known to be born out of divinity. Bhoothath composed hundred verses that are classified as Irantam Tiruvantati and his composition is set in the antati style in which the ending syllable is the starting one for the next verse.

As per Hindu legend, Bhoothath was found in a liquorice flower in Thirukadalmallai (modern-day Mahabalipuram). The poet-saint is regarded to have borne such zeal for the Hindu god Vishnu that he was said to have been possessed by a ghost (Bhūta), where he received his epithet.

According to Sri Vaishnava legend, the three Alvars were once were confined in a small dark enclosure during a rain in Thirukovilur and they experienced a fourth individual among them. They found out that it was god Vishnu and Poigai wished to see his face continuously but could view only from the simmering light of the lightning. With a view to maintain the continuity of light, Poigai instantly composed hundred songs wishing light to emerge. Pey and Bhoothath continued composing hundred songs each on Vishnu.
The works of these earliest saints contributed to the philosophical and theological ideas of Vaishnavism. Along with the three Shaiva Nayanmars, they influenced the ruling Pallava kings of the South Indian region, resulting in changing the religious geography from Buddhism and Jainism to the two sects of Hinduism.

Alvars
The word alvar means the one who dives deep into the ocean of the countless attributes of god. Alvars are considered the twelve supreme devotees of Vishnu, who were instrumental in popularising Vaishnavism. The religious works of these saints in Tamil, songs of love and devotion, are compiled as Nalayira Divya Prabandham containing 4000 verses and the 108 temples revered in their songs are classified as Divya desam. The saints had different origins and belonged to different castes. As per tradition, the first three Alvars, Poigai, Bhutha and Pey were born miraculously. Tirumizhisai was the son of a sage, Thondaradi, Mathurakavi, Peria and Andal were from brahmin community, Kulasekhara from Kshatria community, Namm was from a cultivator family, Tirupana from panar community and Tirumangai from kalvar community. Divya Suri Saritra by Garuda-Vahana Pandita (11th century AD), Guruparamparaprabavam by Pinbaragiya Perumal Jiyar, Periya tiru mudi adaivu by Anbillai Kandadiappan, Yatindra Pranava Prabavam by Pillai Lokacharya, commentaries on Divya Prabandam, Guru Parampara (lineage of Gurus) texts, temple records and inscriptions give a detailed account of the Alvars and their works. According to these texts, the saints were considered incarnations of some form of Vishnu. Poigai is considered an incarnation of Panchajanya (Krishna's conch), Bhoothath of Kaumodakee (Vishnu's Mace/Club), Pey of Nandaka (Vishnu's sword), Thirumalisai of	Sudarshanam (Vishnu's discus), Namm of Vishvaksena (Vishnu's commander), Madhurakavi of	Vainatheya (Vishnu's eagle, Garuda), Kulasekhara of	Kaustubha (Vishnu's necklace), Periy of Garuda (Vishnu's eagle), Andal of Bhoodevi (Vishnu's wife, Lakshmi, in her form as Bhudevi), Thondaradippodi of Vanamaalai (Vishnu's garland), Thiruppaan of Srivatsa (An auspicious mark on Vishnu's chest) and Thirumangai of Saranga (Rama's bow). The songs of Prabandam are regularly sung in all the Vishnu temples of South India daily and also during festivals.

Early life
Since the saint had intuitive knowledge about god Vishnu, he got the name Bhoothath. As per Hindu legend, Bhoothath was found in a liquorice flower in Thirukadalmallai (modern-day Mahabalipuram). His knowledge on Vishnu is inferred by his description of Vishnu in five different forms as para (supreme being), vyuha (cosmic form), vibhava (incarnations), antaryamin (inner dweller) and archa (consecrated image).

Composition
As per Hindu legend, Vishnu appeared to the mutalam Alvars (first three Alvars) at Thirukkoilur. It was day time, but it darkened and started raining heavily. The wandering Poigai found out a small hide out, which has a space for one person to lie down. Bhoothath arrived there looking for a hiding place and Poigai accommodated him, with both sitting together. In the meanwhile, Pey also came to the same place as all the three preferred to stand because of lack of space. The darkness became dense and inside the small room, they were not able to see each other. In the meanwhile, they felt a fourth person also forced his way among them. The three Alvars realised from the light of the lightning that the fourth one had a charming face that was sublime and divine. The trio could immediately realize that it was Vishnu who was huddling among them. Poigai wished to see Vishnu's face continuously but could view only from the simmering light of the lightning. With a view to maintain the continuity of light, he instantly composed hundred songs wishing the earth to be a big pot full of ghee like an ocean where the Sun could be the burning wick.

Bhoothath Alvar also sang 100 songs imagining to light the lamp constantly through ardent love for Him. Peyalvar sang another 100 songs where he described the enchanting charm of the divine face and the association of Narayana equipped with chakra and sankha, and his divine consort goddess Lakshmi.

Bhoothath composed hundred verses that are classified as Irantam Tiruvantati (Transliteration: Second Tiruvantati). Bhoothath’s composition was set in the antati style. The word anta means end and ati means the beginning. The antati style has ending word or the syllable of each verse as the beginning word of the succeeding verse and the last word of the hundredth verse becomes the beginning of the first verse, making the hundred verses a true garland of verses. The works of these earliest saints contributed to the philosophical and theological ideas of Vaishnavism. The verses of the trio speak of Narayana (another name for Vishnu) as the supreme deity and they refer frequently to Trivikrama and Krishna, the avatars of Vishnu.

Mangalasasanam
There are 30 of his pasurams in the 4000 Divya Prabhandham. He has sung in praise of thirteen temples.

Notes

References
 
 
 

Vaishnava saints
Alvars
Tamil Hindu saints